The Ecumenical Theological Seminary is a private seminary in Detroit, Michigan. Founded in 1980 as the Ecumenical Theological Center, the seminary offers graduate degrees and certificates in religious studies.  It is housed in a building built in 1889 to house the First Presbyterian Church; the seminary began leasing the building in 1992 and was donated the building, lands, and endowment in 2002.

History
The seminary traces it roots to the Institute for Advanced Pastoral Studies, an institution founded in 1957 to provide continuing education for Christian ministers.  This institution merged with the Ecumenical Theological Center in 1980.  In 1994, the center changed its name to the Ecumenical Theological Seminary and began offering an academic credential (the "Diploma in Christian Ministry" now the "Urban Ministry Diploma Program").  Three years later, the seminary began the process of gaining accreditation from the Association of Theological Schools.  In 2002, after allowing the seminary to lease the former First Presbyterian Church for ten years, the Presbytery of Detroit gave the seminary the building, its grounds, and it endowment.

Academics
The Ecumenical Theological Seminary awards Master's degrees, Doctoral degrees, and certificates in religious studies and ministry.  The seminary is accredited by the Association of Theological Schools.

Campus

The seminary occupies and owns the building and lands that were originally the First Presbyterian Church. It was built in 1889 and is listed on the National Register of Historic Places, is a designated Michigan State Historic Site (1979), and a contributing property to the Brush Park Historic District.

Architecture
George D. Mason and Zachariah Rice modeled the First Presbyterian Church after Henry Hobson Richardson's Trinity Church in Boston. The church, in the Richardsonian Romanesque style, is made from rough-cut red sandstone, with the floorplan in the shape of a Greek cross.
Masonry arches support a red sandstone tower with a slate roof and turrets at each corner. The stained glass windows of the church are exceptional, with many of Tiffany glass.

When Woodward was widened in 1936, the elaborately-carved entrance porch was moved from the Woodward façade to the Edmund Place side.

A State of Michigan historical marker was placed at the site on August 26, 1980.

Gallery

See also
 First Presbyterian Church (Detroit, Michigan), the historical building and lands occupied by the seminary

References

External links

 Official website

Churches in Detroit
Churches completed in 1889
19th-century Presbyterian church buildings in the United States
Michigan State Historic Sites in Wayne County, Michigan
Historic district contributing properties in Michigan
National Register of Historic Places in Wayne County, Michigan
Churches on the National Register of Historic Places in Michigan
Presbyterian churches in Michigan
Educational institutions established in 1980
Romanesque Revival church buildings in Michigan
Richardsonian Romanesque architecture in Michigan
Sandstone churches in the United States